Glasgow University Medics RFC is a rugby union club based in Glasgow, Scotland.

History

The club was founded in 2001.

The Medics play in the Scottish Rugby Union leagues bur also take part in the SNIMS, the Scottish and Northern Irish Medic Sports.

For charity, in 2016, the team was trained in pole-dancing.

The referee Mike Adamson began his refereeing career with a match between the Medics and the Glasgow University Vets.

Sides

The club runs a men's and women's side. Training is on Wednesday nights.

Honours

Mens

 West Regional Bowl
 Champions (1): 2018

References

Rugby union in Glasgow
Scottish rugby union teams
University and college rugby union clubs in Scotland
Rugby clubs established in 2001
2001 establishments in Scotland